SMAK 1 PENABUR Jakarta (also known as SMUK 1, SMAK 1, nicknamed "SMUKIE") is the best private Christian high school by UTBK Score 2020 in Jakarta, Indonesia. It is located in Tanjung Duren, a financial and residential district in West Jakarta.

SMAK 1 sends its students to local and international competitions, most notably the International Science Olympiads, and the National Science Olympiad.

SMAK 1 is one of 50 schools in Jakarta, Banten, Lampung and West Java managed by BPK PENABUR, a Christian-based organization.

History

Sekolah Menengah Atas Kristen 1 PENABUR - Jakarta (English: PENABUR 1 Christian Senior High School - Jakarta) was established on 1947 as a MULO (Meer Uitgebreid Lager Onderwijs, Colonial Dutch secondary school) in its old location at Pintu Air 11 Road (then known as Sluisbrugstraat 11). Its director was J. C. Boss (1947–1950), a mathematician. In the following year, the school was renamed as CVS (Christelijke Vereniging Scholen, Christian Association School), and its directorial position was taken over by Dr. Van Der Meer (1950–1951).

Following the end of Dutch colonization in Indonesia in 1945, CVS was handed to THKTKH (Tiong Hoa Kie Tok Kauw Hwee, Union of Chinese Christians) and renamed SMA Istimewa (Special High School). Lessons were conducted in Mandarin Chinese and Indonesian.

On August 1, 1950, SMA Istimewa was taken over by BPK Jabar Foundation, and the school underwent major revamping. One of these changes was the adjustment of its name to SMAK 1 (Sekolah Menengah Atas Kristen 1) and the usage of Indonesian as the sole medium of instruction. The addition of the word "Kristen" (Christian) was done to emphasize its Christian roots and values.

In 1956, the school was selected as a model school for the development of other schools in Jakarta. In the same year, it also set the record-high for Indonesian National Physics and Chemistry Examinations, an achievement held until today.

In March 1989, BPK Jabar KPS Jakarta changed its name to BPK PENABUR KPS Jakarta. In the same year SMAK I was moved to its current location of Tanjung Duren Raya Road. The school has a running track,  canteen, sport fields, science laboratories, library, auditorium, language laboratory, music and dance rooms, drawing rooms, a greenhouse, a student counseling center, students' council room, large assembly hall (for up to 1000 people), twenty eight classrooms, etc.

The current principal is Sylviana Chrisyan, S.E., M.M. which has held the position since the 2018 - 2019 academic year along with Jocelyn Emmanuella Mok as the prime leader of the student council for the 2021 - 2022 academic year.

Academic system and curriculum
The school curriculum adheres to the standard Indonesian high school curriculum. The duration of study is three years. First year curriculum includes basic natural and social sciences subjects (mathematics, physics, chemistry, biology, computer science, history, sociology, economics, accounting, civics), Indonesian, English, tertiary foreign language electives (students can choose German, Mandarin Chinese, or Japanese), physical education and Christian theological studies. Students are streamlined in the second year of their study into one of two programs: natural science program or social science program. These specialized curricular exclude subjects tangential to the programs, allowing students to focus on their specializations. In the final year, students are presented with advanced versions of the subjects they learned in the first two years of their study.

The school offers preparation courses for several standardized tests, such as UN (standardized Indonesian national examination), and IELTS.

In addition to having the standard Indonesian curriculum syllabus, the school curriculum also incorporates advanced subjects. These include university level physics (advanced mechanics, relativity, and components of modern physics), chemistry (organic chemistry and biochemistry), mathematics (advanced calculus and algebra) and biology (molecular biology, cell biology and physiology).

Extracurricular activities include sports (basketball, soccer, volleyball, badminton, floorball), martial arts (Capoeira and women martial arts), arts (photography, traditional dance, modern dance, orchestra, music band, choir, manga), robotics, video game programming, debate, and foreign languages (English, German, Japanese, Chinese, and Korean). Students who are eager to learn more about science usually join the science clubs, where more advanced university-level courses are taught. Many students from these science clubs become International Science Olympiad medalists.

Notes

External links

 Official website
 Official Student Council Website

Schools in Jakarta
Schools in Indonesia